The Nativity of the Virgin is an oil on panel painting by the  German Renaissance artist Albrecht Altdorfer, dating to c. 1520, which is now in the Alte Pinakothek in Munich.

Description
The work uses a scenic composition typical of the Danube school of the time. The subject, the birth of Mary, is shown in a secondary location of the lower part of the painting. It includes St. Anne's bed, the midwives with the daughter and St. Joachim riding a stair with something in his hand.  

The predominant part of the work is the church background, where angels fly to form a large circle: in the middle is a young angel with a thurible for the incense.
 
This attention to architectural elements was typical of Altdorfer's work in the period he spent at the court of Maximilian I.

Sources
 

1520 paintings
Collection of the Alte Pinakothek
Paintings by Albrecht Altdorfer
Altdorfer
Angels in art